It'z Different (stylized as IT'z DIFFERENT) is the debut single album by South Korean girl group Itzy. It was released on February 12, 2019, by JYP Entertainment with the lead single "Dalla Dalla".

Background and release 
On January 24, 2019, JYP Entertainment shared the first teasers for the debut of the group, continuing the following day. From January 26 to February 1, the individual teasers for each member were released. The same day, the first teaser for the music video of the lead single "Dalla Dalla" was uploaded on JYP Entertainment's YouTube channel. On February 5, other teaser pictures of the members were released. The following day, the track list of the album was revealed with two songs: "Dalla Dalla" and "Want It?". On February 7, a voice teaser for "Dalla Dalla" was out. On February 8,  the second teaser for the music video was uploaded. Itzy finally debuted on February 12, 2019, by released It'z Different at the same time as the music video for "Dalla Dalla".

Promotion 
Itzy started promoting It'z Different in the live broadcast "The 1st Single Live Premiere" on Naver V Live in which they performed "Dalla Dalla" for the first time.

The group promoted the single album in the South Korean music programs  M Countdown, Show Champion, Show! Music Core,  Music Bank, Inkigayo, and  Show! Music Core in which they received nine music show wins for their debut song.

Critical reception 

It'z Different received generally favorable reviews from critics. IZM'''s Jeong Yeon-kyung stated that: ""Dalla Dalla" borrows a dance beat in a ratchet style, exuding a YG atmosphere, and the personality of Red Velvet and F(x), represented by electronic sounds, comes out. The only choice for JYP style is the old-fashioned 'I'm different' narrative and the 'Gapbunpong (suddenly mood)' chorus, like Miss A's' "I Don't Need a Man", which eventually leads to the same woman with an arrow of blame."Billboard'''s Tamar Herman said that: "The electropop song is an empowering anthem, introducing ITZY as a group that’s an alternative to its peers: the title “Dalla Dalla” is the word for “different” in Korean, repeated. "I'm different from the kids, I'm different,” members sing in the chorus ahead of the chanting titular refrain. “Don't measure me by your standards alone, I love being myself, I'm nobody else.""

Track listing

Charts

Release history

References 

Itzy albums
Korean-language albums
JYP Entertainment albums
2019 albums
Single albums